Jamie Bosio (born 27 March 1991) is a Gibraltarian semi-professional association football player, who currently plays as a central defender for Manchester 62 and the Gibraltar national football team.

International career
Bosio made his international debut for Gibraltar on 24 March 2021 against Norway.

References

1991 births
Living people
Gibraltarian footballers
Gibraltar international footballers
Association football defenders
Gibraltar United F.C. players
Lions Gibraltar F.C. players
Manchester 62 F.C. players
F.C. Olympique 13 players
Gibraltar Premier Division players
Gibraltar National League players